Lake Isabel main refer to:

 Lake Isabel (Colorado)
 Lake Isabel (Flathead County, Montana), a lake in Glacier National Park, Montana
 Lake Isabelle, also called Lake Isabel, a lake in Dakota County, Minnesota

See also
 Lake Isabella (disambiguation)